South African Class 1 4-8-0 may refer to one of the following steam locomotive classes:
 South African Class 1 4-8-0, as built.
 South African Class 1A 4-8-0.
 South African Class 1B 4-8-2, modified back to a 4-8-0 wheel arrangement.